Major General Logan Scott-Bowden,  (21 February 1920 – 9 February 2014) was a British army officer.  A Royal Engineers officer during World War II, he was the first commander of the Ulster Defence Regiment.  Retiring as a major general in 1974, he served as the colonel-commandant of the Royal Engineers from 1975 to 1980.

Early life
Scott-Bowden was born in Whitehaven, Cumbria on 21 February 1920, the son of Lt.Col. Jonathan Scott-Bowden, OBE, TD, and Mary Scott-Bowden (née Logan).  He was educated at Malvern College and the Royal Military Academy, Woolwich.  He was commissioned into the Royal Engineers on 3 July 1939.

Military career
Scott-Bowden saw early service in Norway in 1940, before joining the 53rd (Welsh) Infantry Division as an Adjutant in 1941.  During 1942 and 1943 he served on liaison duty with Canadian and American forces.

In mid 1943 Scott-Bowden joined  Combined Operations Pilotage Parties (COPP), the reconnaissance unit tasked with scouting the beaches for the D Day landings. Scott-Bowden and another COPPist, Sergeant Bruce Ogden-Smith, swam ashore in Normandy over thirty times to obtain sand samples to see whether the beach would support tanks.

A trial landing at a Norfolk beach had proved that they would not be detected when they swam ashore at night from an LCT.

At midnight on 31 December 1943, Scott-Bowden and Ogden-Smith, during Operation KJH, landed on Gold Beach to take samples of the material from the beach. They swam ashore from a landing craft operated by 712th Landing Craft Personnel (Survey) Flotilla. They found that the sand, in places, was thin and supported by weak peat material. They took samples back to the United Kingdom that allowed planners to cope with the weaker-than-expected beaches.

Scott-Bowden and Ogden-Smith returned to Normandy from 17–21 January 1944, this time operating from X20, an X-class midget submarine, during Operation Bellpush Able. They twice swam ashore onto sectors of Omaha Beach. After returning to the UK, Scott-Bowden was summoned to a briefing with General Omar Bradley. Scott-Bowden said to him "Sir, I hope you don’t mind me saying it, but this beach is a very formidable proposition indeed and there are bound to be tremendous casualties." Bradley put his hand on his shoulder and replied "I know, my boy. I know." 
  
On D Day both Sgt. Ogden-Smith and Maj. Scott-Bowden assisted in piloting the initial American landings on Omaha Beach. He then went on to command 17 Field Squadron for the remainder of the War.

After World War II, he had operational service in Burma, Palestine, Korea, Aden and lastly in Northern Ireland. In Northern Ireland he was given the challenging task of forming the Ulster Defence Regiment. His final appointment in the Armed Services, on promotion to Major General, was as Head of the British Defence Liaison Staff, India. After retirement from active service Scott-Bowden served as the Colonel-Commandant of the Royal Engineers from 1975 to 1980.

Personal life
In 1950 he married Helen Jocelyn, daughter of late Major Sir Francis Caradoc Rose Price, 5th Bt, and late Marjorie Lady Price.  They had three sons and three daughters.

Honours
Commander of the Order of the British Empire (CBE) 1 January 1972
Officer of the Order of the British Empire (OBE) 6 June 1964
Distinguished Service Order 15 June 1944 (Operation Bell Push Able, Normandy reconnaissance January 1944)
Military Cross (MC) 2 March 1944 Operation KJH (Normandy reconnaissance December 1943 - January 1944)
Bar to the Military Cross (MC and Bar) 22 January 1946

Appointments
He held a number of appointments throughout his career including:

Ranks

References

External links
British Army Officers 1939−1945

1920 births
2014 deaths
British Army generals
British Army personnel of the Korean War
British Army personnel of World War II
Commanders of the Order of the British Empire
Companions of the Distinguished Service Order
Graduates of the Royal Military Academy, Woolwich
Graduates of the Staff College, Camberley
Military personnel from Cumberland
Graduates of Joint Services Command and Staff College
People educated at Malvern College
People from Whitehaven
Recipients of the Military Cross
Royal Engineers officers
Ulster Defence Regiment officers
National Defence College, India alumni